Milan Čeleketić (born 12 August 1946) is a Serbian former major general active in the Serbian Army of Krajina and in the Armed Forces of FR Yugoslavia during and after the Croatian War of Independence.

Čeleketić was Commander of the 18th Western Slavonian Corps of the Serbian Army of Krajina. He became Chief of the Main Staff of the Serbian Army of Krajina on 22 February 1994. After the fall of Western Slavonia, he resigned as Chief on 17 May 1995.

After Operation Storm, he lived in Banja Luka for a time.

References

1946 births
Living people
People from Kikinda
Military of Serbian Krajina
Serbian soldiers
Yugoslav soldiers
Officers of the Yugoslav People's Army
Military personnel of the Croatian War of Independence
Serbian people of Bosnia and Herzegovina descent